Kerochariesthes is a genus of longhorn beetles of the subfamily Lamiinae, containing the following species:

 Kerochariesthes fulvoplagiata (Breuning, 1938)
 Kerochariesthes holzschuhi Téocchi, 1989

References

Tragocephalini
Cerambycidae genera